"Maybe This Day" is a song by the English New Wave band Kissing the Pink, released as both a 7" and 12" single from their debut studio album, Naked (1983). The single was released by Magnet Records in the UK, and Atlantic Records in the US, it peaked at No. 83 on the UK Singles Chart, and No. 87 on the US Billboard Hot 100 (their first entry on that chart). The U.K. single features the non-album tracks, "Middleton Row" and a special club mix of "We Are Your Family" as its B-side, while the U.S. single contains the non-album track, "Garden Party".

A music video for the song was also made, shot and filmed in various areas of London and inside of a hotel and a dance nightclub.

Track listing
7" single
"Maybe This Day"
"Middleton Row"

12" single
"Maybe This Day"
"We Are Your Family (Special Club Version)"
"Middleton Row"

Chart performance

References

External links
 

Kissing the Pink songs
1983 singles
1983 songs
Song recordings produced by Colin Thurston